Abryutino is a rural locality (a selo) in Yekimovskoye Rural Settlement of Ryazansky District, Ryazan Oblast, Russia. The population was 13 as of 2010. There are 2 streets.

Geography 
Abryutino is located 18 km southwest of Ryazan (the district's administrative centre) by road. Abryutinskie Vyselki is the nearest rural locality.

References 

Rural localities in Ryazan Oblast